Michael Jonathan Braddick, FBA, FRHistS (born 29 August 1962) is a British historian and academic specialising in early modern Britain. Educated at the University of Cambridge (BA, PhD), he is now Professor of History at the University of Sheffield. He was Pro-Vice-Chancellor and Head of the Faculty of Arts and Humanities from 2009 to 2013.

He is a member of the Editorial Board for Past & Present.

References

1962 births
Academics of the University of Sheffield
Fellows of the British Academy
Fellows of the Royal Historical Society
Living people